Mannosylfructose-phosphate synthase (mannosylfructose-6-phosphate synthase, MFPS) is an enzyme with systematic name GDP-mannose:D-fructose-6-phosphate 2-alpha-D-mannosyltransferase. This enzyme catalyses the following chemical reaction

 GDP-mannose + D-fructose 6-phosphate  GDP + beta-D-fructofuranosyl-alpha-D-mannopyranoside 6F-phosphate

This enzyme, from the soil proteobacterium and plant pathogen Agrobacterium tumefaciens strain C58, requires Mg2+ or Mn2+ for activity.

References

External links 
 

EC 2.4.1